The following is a partial list of chairs with descriptions, with internal or external cross-references about most of the chairs. For other chair-like types (like bench, stool), see

0-9

 10 Downing Street Guard Chairs, two antique chairs used by guards in the early 19th century
 40/4 (forty-in-four) stacking Chair designed by David Rowland, 1964
 406 Aalto armchair, designed by Alvar Aalto in 1938; IKEA sells a similar design as the Poäng lounge chair
 601 Chair by Dieter Rams
 620 Chair by Dieter Rams for Vitsœ
 654W Lounge Chair (Model 654W), designed by Jens Risom for Knoll

A
 "A" Chair (Chaise A), designed by Xavier Pauchard for Tolix in 1927. Later variants including the "A56" were designed by Pauchard's sons. 
 Alta chair and ottoman by Oscar Niemeyer
  Adirondack chair, a non-adjustable wooden outdoor lounge chair
 Aeron chair, an ergonomic trademarked chair designed by Don Chadwick and Bill Stumpf for Herman Miller
 Air chair, a lightweight moulded chair design by Jasper Morrison
 Armchair, has armrests for comfort; couches, sofas, etc.

B

 Bachelor's chair, dates from the 18th century and converts into a stepstool, ladder or ironing board
 Backpack chair, a combination of a backpack and a chair, sometimes used for camping, hiking or short hunting trips
  Balans chair, designed by Norwegian furniture designer Peter Opsvik in 1979, is the original kneeling chair design
  Ball Chair, designed by Finnish furniture designer Eero Aarnio in 1963 (also see: Bubble chair)
 Bar stool, tall narrow stool designed for seating at a bar or counter
 Barber's Chair 
 Barcelona chair, designed in 1929 by Lilly Reich and Ludwig Mies van der Rohe and widely copied since; characterized by leather upholstery, an angled seat and back without armrests, and X-shaped steel legs
 Bardic chair, custom chair built every year for the winner of an Awdl poetry contest in Wales
  Barrel chair, has a high round back like half a barrel; large and upholstered
 Bath chair, light carriage on wheels with a folding hood, for outdoor transport, often used by invalids
 Beach chair (Strandkorb), designed to provide comfort and protection from sun, wind, rain, and sand on beaches frequented by tourists
  Bean bag chair. The first bean bag chair is Sacco, designed in 1968 by the Italian designers Piero Gatti, Cesare Paolini, Franco Teodoro for Zanotta.
 Bergère, upholstered chair introduced in the Régence/Rococo period in France in the 17th century
 Bertoia side chair, steel grid wire chairs for Knoll by sculptor Harry Bertoia
  Bikini chair, designed by architect Wendell Lovett in 1949 and first exhibited in 10th Triennale di Milano 1954; made of metal, molded plastic, and leather; featured in the magazine Domus February 1954 (#291)
 Bofinger chair, first chair worldwide in fiberglass-reinforced polyester to be produced in one single process over a steel mould; considered a classic of modern furniture design history
 Bosun's chair, a device used to suspend a person from a rope to perform work aloft
 Brewster Chair, a style of upright, turned, wooden armchair made in the mid-17th century in New England named after Pilgrim and colonial leader William Brewster of Plymouth, Massachusetts
 Bubble Chair, designed by Eero Aarnio in 1968 in Finland; a modernist classic
 Buddy bench, a special place in a school playground where a child can go when he or she wants someone to talk to
 Bungee chair, any chair which incorporates bungee cords as a primary material
 Butterfly chair (BKF chair) designed in 1938 by Bonet, Kurchan and Ferrari-Hardoy (Argentina); a light folding metal frame with a large cloth or leather sling hung from the frame's four high points
 ButtOn Chair, designed for "fidgety children" in classrooms. Like a stool with a seat that tilts and requires active balance.

C
 Campeche chair, a 19th-century Mexican lounge chair, popular in Latin America, the Caribbean, and the American South. It has X-shaped sides and a sling seat and back made of leather, cane or wood slats. Similar to a planter's chair, but without the extended arms.
 Cantilever chair, has no back legs; for support its seat and back cantilever off the top of the front legs (see: Cesca chair)
 Captain's chair, was originally a low-backed wooden armchair; today the term is often applied to adjustable individual seats in a car with arm rests
 Caquetoire, also known as a conversation chair, used in the European Renaissance, was developed for women because it was wider so women's fashions at the time could fit into it; this is demonstrated by the "U" shaped arms
 Car chair, a car seat in an automobile in which either the pilot or passenger sits, customarily in the forward direction. Many car chairs are adorned in leather or synthetic material designed for comfort or relief from the noted stress of being seated. Variants include a toddler's or infant's carseat, which are often placed atop an existing chair and secured by way of extant seat belts or other such articles.
 Carver chair, similar to a Brewster chair and from the same region and period
 Cathedra, a bishop's ceremonial chair
 Chaise a bureau, a Rococo style of chair, created during the first half of the 18th century, constructed so it could sit in a corner of a room (there is one leg directly in the back and one directly in the front, and then one leg on each side)
 Cesca Chair ("Breuer Chair"), designed by Marcel Breuer for Knoll
 Chaperone chair, a three-seat chair from the 1800s that allowed a chaperone to observe a courting couple (see: Courting chair)
  Chaise longue (French for "long chair"), a chair with a seat long enough to completely support its user's legs. In the U.S., it is often mistakenly referred to as a 'chaise lounge'. Similar, if not identical to, a day bed, fainting couch, or récamier.
 Chesterfield chair, a low club-style chair with a fully buttoned or tufted interior, typically made of leather
 Chiavari chair, designed in 1870 by Giuseppe Gaetano Descalzi of Chiavari in Italy. The chair is lightweight, has elegant lines, yet is strong, practical and easy to handle. 
  Club chair, a plush easy chair with a low back. The heavy sides form armrests that are usually as high as the back. The modern club chair is based upon the club chairs used by the popular and fashionable urban gentlemen's clubs of 1850s England.
 Cockfighting chair, an 18th-century chair for libraries where the seat and arms were shaped so that a reader could sit astride to use a small desk attached to the back. Despite its popular name a sketch from 1794 in the Gillow archives lists it as a "Reading Chair".
 Coconut chair, designed by George Nelson for Herman Miller
 Cogswell chair, a brand of upholstered easy chairs. It has a sloping back and curved and ornamental front legs. The armrests are open underneath.
 Corner chair, made to fit into a corner and has a rectangular base with a high back on two adjacent sides; one sits with legs straddling a corner of the base
 Coronation Chair, an ancient wooden chair on which British monarchs sit when they are invested with regalia and crowned at their coronations.
 Curule chair was a folding cross-framed seat that developed hieratic significance in Republican Rome. The shape of its legs was revived in the Empire style.

D
 Dante chair, similar to the Savonarola chair with a more solid frame and a cushioned seat
  Deckchair, a chair with a fabric or vinyl back and seat that folds flat by a scissors action round a transverse axis. The fabric extends from the sitter's feet to head. It may have an extended seat that is meant to be used as a leg rest and may have armrests. It was originally designed for passenger lounging while aboard ocean liners or ships.
 Dentist chair, a deeply reclining chair to allow the dentist easy access to the patient's mouth. The reclining position adjusts as well as the overall height of the chair. Associated with the chair are usually a variety of dental equipment, often including a small tap and sink for the patient to rinse his or her mouth.
 Dining chair, designed to be used at a dining table; typically, dining chairs are part of a dining set, where the chairs and table feature similar or complementary designs.  The oldest known depiction of dining chairs is a seventh-century BCE bas-relief of an Assyrian king and queen on very high chairs.
 Diamond Lounge Chair, designed by Harry Bertoia for Knoll
 Director's chair, a lightweight chair that folds side-to-side with a scissors action. The seat and back are made of canvas or a similar strong fabric which bears the user's full weight and can be folded; the frame is made of wood, or sometimes metal or plastic. The seat and scissors members work together to support and distribute the sitter's weight so that the seat is comfortably taut. The back is usually low and the chair usually has armrests. The stereotypical image of a movie director on location includes one of these chairs, hence the name. Victor Papanek describes this chair as an excellent design in his book Design for the Real World as it is simple and ideally suited to its function. The design goes back to coffer-makers' chairs of the 15th century and eventually to the Roman curule chair.

E

 Easy chair, large, soft, and very comfortable; usually upholstered
 Easy Edges, chair made of corrugated cardboard designed by architect Frank Gehry
 Eames Lounge Chair, a trademark for molded plywood chairs, contoured to fit the shape of a person
 Egg chair, designed by Arne Jacobsen for Fritz Hansen resembles an egg
 Electric chair, a device for capital punishment by electrocution; a high-backed chair with arms and restraints, usually made of oak
  Elijah's chair, a chair set aside for the prophet Elijah at Jewish circumcision ceremonies
 Emeco 1006, a durable aluminum chair original developed for the US Navy

F
 Farthingale chair, an armless chair with a wide seat covered in usually high-quality fabric and fitted with a cushion. The backrest is an upholstered panel, with legs that are straight and rectangular. It was introduced as a chair for ladies in the late 16th century and was named in England, probably in the 19th century, for its ability to accommodate the exceptionally wide-hooped skirts fashionable of the time.
 Fauteuil, an open-arm chair with considerable exposed wood, originating in 18th-century France
 Fiddleback chair, a wooden chair of the Empire period, usually with an upholstered seat, in which the splat resembles a fiddle
 Fighting chair is a chair on a boat used by anglers to catch large saltwater fish. The chair typically swivels and has a harness to keep the angler strapped in should the fish tug hard on the line.
 Floating tensegrity chair by Manfred Kielnhofer, ARTPARK 2020
 Folding chair, collapses in some way for easy storage and transport. Various folding chairs have their own names (e.g., deckchair, director's chair), but a chair described simply as a folding chair folds a rigid frame and seat around a transverse axis so that the seat becomes parallel to the back and the frame collapses with a scissors action. Some further collapse the feet up to the back. Folding chairs may be designed to stack on top of each other when folded and may come with special trolleys to move stacks of folded chairs. Folding chairs are sometimes used in professional wrestling as weapons.
 Folding seat, a fixed seat on a bus, a tram or a passenger car

G
 Gainsborough chair, an armchair with a high back, open sides and short arms
 Gaming chair, legless, curved/L-shaped, generally upholstered, and sometimes contains built-in electronic devices like loudspeakers and vibration to enhance the video game experience; the five main types of gaming chairs are bean bags, rockers, pedestals, racers, and cockpits
 Garden Egg chair, designed by Peter Ghyczy and a modernist classic
  Glastonbury chair, a wooden chair with flat seat and sloping back; design dates from at least the early Middle Ages
 Glider (or platform rocker), offers the same motions as a rocking chair but without the dangers; a frame rests on the floor and the chair is supported by swing arms within the frame so that moving parts are less accessible
 Gossip bench or telephone table, an early 20th century chair with a built-in telephone stand
 Grown chairs, using shaping of living trees and other woody plants to create structures

H
 Handkerchief Chair, designed by Lella and Massimo Vignelli for Knoll in 1983
 Hassock, an upholstered seat that is low to the ground and has no backrest
  High chair, a children's chair to raise them to the height of adults for feeding. They typically come with a detachable tray so that the child can sit apart from the main table. Booster chairs raise the height of children on regular chairs so they can eat at the main dining table. Some high chairs are clamped directly to the table and thus are more portable.
 Hanging Egg Chair, designed by Danish furniture designer Nanna Ditzel in 1957
 Hepplewhite chair, English furniture designer and cabinet maker George Hepplewhite active in the 1700s (see also: Thomas Sheraton and Thomas Chippendale)

I
 Inflatable chair, usually children's toys made out of plastic; IKEA briefly marketed them as serious furniture upholstered in fabric; some are designed for use as floating lounge chairs in swimming pools.
 Iquo chair, an indoor-outdoor stacking chair by Ini Archibong for Knoll
 Ironing chair, a lightly built folding chair usually with a metal frame and small padded seat and either a minimal padded back or a simple tubular loop back. The chair is usually used as a 'perch', a support for carrying out an activity - such as ironing - by people with disabilities or back problems, but they are also popular with anyone requiring a light supporting chair for extended periods, such as observing through a telescope.
 Ironrite Health Chair, 1930s ironing chair manufactured by the Ironrite Ironer company

J
 Jack and Jill, similar to the Adirondack chair, but consists of two of them joined in the middle by a table
 Donald Judd chairs, early 1970s minimalist furniture by artist Donald Judd
 Jump seat, auxiliary seat in airplanes and other vehicles

K
 Kneeling chairs or knee-sit chairs,  meant to support someone kneeling. This is purportedly better for the back than sitting all day. The main seat is sloped forward at about 30 degrees so that the person would normally slide off, but there is a knee rest to keep the person in place.
 Knotted chair, designed by Marcel Wanders in 1995 for Droog design and then manufactured by Cappellini

L
 Ladderback chair, a wooden arm or side chair in which the horizontal elements of the back give the appearance of a ladder; typically described by the number of such elements; a 'five-back', a 'three-back'; on better examples, the width of these elements is graduated, wider to narrower, top to bottom
 Lambing chair, a wood "box" form of winged arm chair rarely having upholstery. Storage under the seat is common as a drawer or compartment.
 Lawn chair, usually a light, folding chair for outdoor use on soft surfaces. The left and right legs are joined along the ground into a single foot to make a broader contact area with the ground. Individual feet would otherwise dig into soft grass.
 La-Z-Boy, reclining chair brand 
 LessThanFive Chair, lightweight carbon fibre chair by Michael Young for Steelcase
 Lifeguard chairs, enable a lifeguard to sit on a high perch at the beach to better look for swimmers in distress
 Lift chair, a powered lifting mechanism that pushes the entire chair up from its base, allowing the user to easily move to a standing position
 Litter, also known as "sedan chair", a covered chair carried by people and used to transport others
 Lockheed Lounge designed by Marc Newson
 Louis Ghost chair, a transparent polycarbonate design by Philippe Starck for Kartell
 Louis Seize (XVI) armchair

M
 Mackintosh chairs 
 Massage chair, has electromechanical devices to massage the occupant. Another kind of massage chair is one used by a therapist on which the client sits in an inverted position with the back facing the massage therapist. There is a headrest like that of the common massage table for the face.
 Mezzadro Seat, an unconventional chair by Achille and Pier Giacomo Castiglioni for Zanotta

 Ming chair
 Monobloc chair, a cheap, light-weight, stackable, weatherproof, easily cleaned, single-piece polypropylene chair designed for mass production via injection molding
 Morris chair, a proprietary easy chair with adjustable back, cushions, and armrests
 Muskoka chair, another name for an Adirondack chair, particularly in Canada

N
 Navy chair, a durable all-aluminum chair originally developed for the US Navy
 No. 14 chair, the most famous bentwood sidechair originally made by the Thonet chair company of Germany in the 19th century, and widely copied and popular today
 Nursing chair, a low-seated partially upholstered chair used in Victorian times, with emphasis on a woman breast-feeding an infant

O
 Office chair, typically swivels, tilts, and rolls about on casters, or small wheels. It may be very plushly upholstered and in leather and thus characterized as an "executive chair", or come with a low back and be called a steno chair. Office chairs often have a number of ergonomic adjustments: seat height, armrest height and width, and back reclining tension. They are also known as a Task chairs.
 Orbiter, a brand of camera seat used by camera operators that swivels at a low working height.
 ON Chair, has a patented three-dimensional sitting arrangement; incorporates lateral movement to standard office chair height and reclining positions
 Ottoman, a thick cushion used as a seat or a low stool, or as a rest for the feet of a seated person
 Ovalia Egg Chair, similar to the Ball Chair but egg-shaped; designed by Henrik Thor-Larsen in 1968
 Onit chair, a chair which is also a set of steps and an ironing board.

P

 Panton Chair, a one-piece plastic chair by Danish designer Verner Panton
 Papasan chair, a large, rounded, bowl-shaped chair with an adjustable angle similar to that of a futon; the bowl rests in an upright frame made of sturdy wicker or wood originally from the Philippines
 Paper tube chair by Manfred Kielnhofer for Artpark 
 Parsons chair, curving wooden chair named for the Parsons School of Design in New York, where it was created and widely copied today
 Peacock chair, a large wicker chair with a flared back, originating in the Philippines; an exaggerated Windsor chair design by Hans Wegner (1947); also a chair designed by Dror studio for Cappellini
 Pew, a bench in a church
 Pew stacker chair, stackable chair used primarily by churches that allows chairs arranged in rows to be linked together in such a way that the seats and backs form a bench- or pew-like feel and appearance
 Planter's chair, wooden chair with stretchable arms to rest the legs
 Platner Arm Chair, designed by Warren Platner for Knoll
 Plia folding chair, designed by Giancarlo Piretti for Anonima Castelli
 Poäng, a flat-pack cantilevered bentwood armchair manufactured and marketed by Ikea, with more than 30 million made since its introduction in 1978, and 1.5 million sold annually.
 Poofbag chair, similar to an oversized bean-bag chair filled with urethane foam
 Pop chair, a whimsical variation of a patio chair designed by Brad Ascalon 
 Porter's chair or hood chair, a chair placed near the entrance of a large house for use by a servant responsible for admitting visitors (see also: 10 Downing Street Guard Chairs)
 Potty chair (often abbreviated simply as "potty"), a training toilet for children; in pre-indoor plumbing times this was a chair beneath the seat of which a chamber pot was installed
 Portuguese chair, metal outdoor armchair originally developed by the Portuguese furniture company Adico in the 1930s as the 5008 chair,  becoming a symbol of the Portuguese cafe culture. The Gonçalo chair, designed by Gonçalo Rodrigues dos Santos in the 1940s, is one of the most famous derivatives of the 5008 chair.
 Pouffe, furniture used as a footstool or low seat
 Power chairs, with responsive joystick controls and a tight turning circle for elderly or disabled people to move around a house
 Pressback chair, a wooden chair of the Victorian period, usually of oak, into the crest rail and/or splat of which a pattern is pressed with a steam press
 Pushchair or stroller, a chair with wheels, which usually folds for transporting an infant; some countries, including the U.S., use "stroller"; others, including the UK, "pushchair"

Q

R

 Recliner, a chair with a reclining back; most are armchairs and may come with a footrest that unfolds when the back is reclined
 Red and Blue Chair a chair designed by Dutch architect and furniture designer Gerrit Rietveld.
 Resilient Chair, designed by Eva Zeisel for Hudson Fixtures (1948)
 Restraint chair, a type of physical restraint used to prevent injury to themselves or others
 Revolving chair, an older term for swivel chair
 Rex chair, a foldable chair designed by Slovene designer Niko Kralj in 1952
 Ribbon Chair (model 582), designed by Pierre Paulin in 1966.
 Ribbon Chair, designed by Niels Bendtsen in 1975. This chair is on display in a permanent collection at The Museum of Modern Art in New York.
  Rocking chair (rocker), typically a wooden side chair or armchair with legs mounted on curved rockers, so that the chair can sway back and forth; sometimes the rocking chair is on springs or on a platform (a "platform rocker") to avoid crushing anything, particularly children's feet or pets' tails, that get under the rockers
 Rover chair, designed by Ron Arad
 Rumble seat

S
 "S" chair, designed by Tom Dixon for Cappellini
 Saddle chair, uses the same principles in its design as an equestrian saddle; does not have a backrest but is equipped with a chair base on casters and a gas cylinder for adjusting the correct sitting height; the casters enable moving around and reaching out for i.e. tools while sitting
 Savonarola chair, a folding armchair dating from the Italian Renaissance. Typically constructed of walnut, it is sometimes called an X-chair. The Savonarola chair was the first important folding armchair created during the Italian Gothic Renaissance period.
 Sedan chair, an open or enclosed chair attached to twin poles for carrying; using this form of transport, an occupant can be carried by two or more porters
 Sgabello, from the Italian Renaissance and made of walnut, consisting of a thin seat back and an octagonal seat; sometimes considered a stool and was often placed in hallways
 Shaker rocker, one of several forms of rocking chair, including side chairs, made by Shakers
 Shaker tilting chair, allowed a person to lean back with the chair without slipping or scraping the floor
  Shower chair, a chair which is not damaged by water, sometimes on wheels, and used as a disability aid in a shower, similar to a wheelchair but has no foot pads; is waterproof and dries quickly
 Side chair, a chair with a seat and back but without armrests; often matched with a dining table or used as an occasional chair
 Sit-stand chair, normally used with a height-adjustable desk, allows the person to lean against this device and be partially supported
 Sling chair, a suspended, free-swinging chair hanging from a ceiling
 Slumber chair, an easy chair manufactured by C. F. Streit Mfg. Co. in the first half of the 20th century; has a combination upholstered back and seat portion, the inclination of which is adjustable within a base frame; later versions of this chair had a footstool with a removable top that could reveal a "slipper-compartment"
 Spinning chair, commonly used with computers due to its ability to move freely
 Stacking chair, designed to stack compactly on top of each other to minimize storage space required
 Steno chair, a simple office chair, usually without arms, meant for use by secretarial (or a stenographer) staff
 Step chair, a chair which doubles as a small set of steps when folded out.
 Superleggera chair by Gio Ponti (1955) 
 Sweetheart chair, as used in soda shops, also known as a "parlor chair" and an "ice cream chair" (from use in ice cream parlors); the wire frame in the center of the back curls in a manner to suggest a heart design but the term "sweetheart chair" also has a more generic usage and refers to any chair with a heart-shaped design in the center of the back
 Swivel chairs, swivel about a vertical axis; commonly used in offices, often on casters

T
  Tantra Chair, for practicing the Kama Sutra
 Tarachair, high-legged wooden chair designed to encourage raised conversation between people, popular first in San Francisco and now Los Angeles
 Tête-à-tête chair, also known as a courting bench, a type of settee consisting of two connected chairs which allow two people to sit facing one another
 Thinking Man's Chair, designed by Jasper Morrison for Cappellini
 Throne, a ceremonial chair for a monarch or similar dignitary of high rank
 Toilet chair, a disability aid attached to a normal toilet
 Transat chair, designed by Eileen Gray
 Tuffet, a low seat often used as a footrest, similar to an ottoman but shorter and with no legs
 Tulip chair, designed by Eero Saarinen in 1956 and considered a classic of industrial design
 Turned chair (or thrown chair or spindle chair), made of turned wood spindles by turners (with the use of a lathe), rather than by joiners or carpenters
 two-slat post-and-rung shaving chair, made from green wood, rived and shaved with a drawknife rather than turned, made by Jennie Alexander

U
 Ultraleggera 1660, very light carbon fibre chair by Oskar Zieta (homage to Gio Ponti’s Superleggera chair)

V

W
 Wainscot Chair, an unupholstered oak chair popular in 17th-century colonial America
 Watchman's chair, an unupholstered wooden chair with a forward slanted seat to prevent a watchman from falling asleep
 Wassily Chair, a tubular-steel chair designed by Marcel Breuer
  Wheelchair, a chair on wheels for someone who cannot walk or has difficulty walking
 Wicker chair, made of wicker and is thus ventilated and useful under hot or humid conditions; likewise, a cane chair
 Wiggle chair, cardboard seating form designed by Frank Gehry in 1972
 Windsor chair, a classic, informal chair usually constructed of wood turnings that form a high-spoked back, often topped by a shaped crest rail, outward-sloped legs, and stretchers that reinforce the legs. The seat is often saddled or sculpted for extra comfort, and some Windsors have shaped arms supported by short spindles.
 Wing chair, an upholstered easy chair with large "wings" mounted to the armrests and enclosing the head or torso areas of the body; originally designed to provide comfortable protection from drafts; a variation is the Queen Anne wing chair
 Wishbone chair, a chair with a wishbone-shaped backrest and a woven paper seat.

 Womb chair designed by Eero Saarinen for Knoll
 Writing armchair, the most compact rendition of a school desk

X
 X-chair, a chair with an X-shaped frame

Y

Z
 Zaisu, a Japanese legless chair
 Zakopane Style chairs
 Zig-Zag Chair, designed by Gerrit Rietveld

References

External links

Design-related lists
Furniture